Adelinia grandis, previously known as Cynoglossum grande, is a species of flowering plant in the borage family known as Pacific hound's tongue. It is the only species in the genus Adelinia. 

The genus name of Adelinia is in honour of Adeline Etta Cohen (b. 2014), daughter of the American botanist and author of the plant, James I.Cohen.

Pacific hound's tongue is native to western North America from British Columbia to California, where it grows in shady areas in woodland and chaparral. On the forest floor of California oak woodlands typical plant associates are Calochortus luteus, Delphinium variegatum and Calochortus amabilis. It is a perennial herb producing an erect stem 30 to 90 centimeters tall from a taproot. The leaves are mostly located around the base of the plant, each with an oval blade up to 15 centimeters long held on a petiole. The inflorescence is a panicle of flowers on individual pedicels. Each five-lobed flower is bright to deep blue with white appendages at the center. It is 1 to 1.5 centimeters wide. The fruit is an array of four slightly bristly nutlets.

Uses
Native Americans made a preparation of the roots to treat burns and stomach aches.

References

 C. Michael Hogan. 2009. Gold Nuggets: Calochortus luteus, GlobalTwitcher.com, ed. N. Stromberg
 Jepson Manual. 1993. Cynoglossum grande
 Larry Ulrich. 2002. Wildflowers of Henry W. Coe State Park

External links
UC Photo gallery − Cynoglossum grande

Boraginaceae
Flora of the West Coast of the United States
Plants described in 1830
Monotypic asterid genera
Boraginaceae genera